

Events
Sordello composes the first sirventes-planh in order to mark the death of his patron Blacatz

Births
 Adam de la Halle (died 1288), a French trouvère, poet and musician

Deaths
 Blacatz (born 1165), Occitan troubadour
 Hélinand of Froidmont died after 1229 - likely 1237 (born 1160), medieval poet, chronicler, and ecclesiastical writer in Latin
 Fujiwara no Ietaka (born 1158), Japanese Kamakura period waka poet

13th-century poetry
Poetry